Grzegorz Kmiecik (born April 17, 1984, in Kraków) is a Polish footballer playing currently for Sandecja Nowy Sącz. He is a son of former Polish football star- Kazimierz Kmiecik. Grzegorz is a very tall striker. He is a trainee of Wisła Kraków.

References

1984 births
Living people
Polish footballers
ŁKS Łódź players
Wisła Kraków players
GKS Katowice players
Sandecja Nowy Sącz players
Footballers from Kraków
Association football forwards